The Kundi is a sub-tribe of the Niazi tribe of Pashtuns, that inhabit most areas of Tank and D.I.Khan.

Background 

The Kundi are a sub-tribe of the Niazi tribe  that live in Di khan, Mianwali, Waziristan. In Tank, they have spread along the Tank-Darra Pezu road, extending up to Amakhel And Mulazai and the adjoining Bettani area. The Mulazai is accessible through a road that begins at the old Gul Imam railway station. The area around this road is mainly inhabited by Kundis, with a little pocket of Marwats. 

The Kundi area acts as a buffer zone between Tank and Marwats connected through the Pezu and Bayan pass. These were the old caravan routes on which the British constructed as asphalt roads. The main villages of Kundis in Tank are Amakhel, Gul Imam, Shahalam, Abezari, Daraki (Mekhani), Pai, Nandoor and wandazallo (malagan). Mulazai is a mixture of Kundi and Syeds from Kaniguram and Marwats in some parts.

Pai‚ Abizari and Shahalam are the ancestral home villages of Kundi Khans. Kundis populate the majority of Tank District of Khyber-Pakhtunkhwa in Pakistan, some areas in D.I. Khan, some parts of Afghanistan (Zabul), some of the parts in Balochistan. The ancestors of this tribe are from Zabul (Afghanistan) and Kundayghar in South Waziristan Agency.

Many Kundis have rendered their services in the fields of education, politics, civil services and judiciary research in Pakistan. The tribe fought many wars against the Nawabs of Tank in the late 1800s; outcomes included both victories and losses. Moreover, this tribe is constantly involved in internal conflicts as other Pashtun tribes are involved.

Ancestry

Kundi or Kondi bin Esa bin Khako bin Niazi bin Ibrahim Loede bin Shah Hussain. Kundi had two sons: Minak or Sinak and Ibrahim. Descendants of Kundi are divided into two tribes: Minakzai and Ibrahimzai.

Sub-tribes
 AstanKhel
 MianKhel
 Karkikhel
 Burakhel
 Achakhel
 Shirkikhel
 Mali Khel (Shadi Khel) Nandoor
 Ibrahim Khel
 Tajo Khel
 Noor Khani Khel
 Daras Khel (Daraki)
 Tinikhial (Darraki)
 Fathekhel (Amakhel)
 Dewanshahkhel (Malagan)
 Niazikhel (Malagan)
 Firdoskhel (Malagan)
 Gulbazkhel (Malagan)
 Darreykhel (Malagan)
 Lawangkhel (Malagan)

References

Pakistani names
 History of Khyber Pakhtunkhwa
Pashtun tribes